Suzanne Clachair is an Australian singer and songwriter.

Career
Suzanne Clachair first came to prominence at age 16 after winning the ABC's nationally-televised talent show Quest with her performance of "Don't Cry for Me Argentina". 

Clachair completed a scholarship in singing at the Queensland Conservatorium of Music and later graduated with a Business Degree in Communication from Queensland University of Technology and a Diploma in Education from The University of Queensland. She found employment first as a High School teacher and later, a Marketing consultant all the while maintaining a passion for her music.

Almost a decade after winning Quest, a TV commercial feating Clachair sining "Barcarolle" was the catalyst Clachair's recording career. The commercial took the public by storm; the TV Network was inundated with callers wanting to purchase the vocal soundtrack.

WEA Records signed and released Clachair's debut album of the same name in 1988. The album peaked at number 38 on the ARIA charts in May 1989. 

In 1990, Clachair gave birth to her first child and signed with CBS Records, which released Serenade. The album peaked at number 20 on the ARIA chart and was certified gold. A TV special, An Evening with Suzanne Clachair was also aired.

In 1991, Clachair was the special guest during Julio Iglesias' Australian tour and she performed with him in Las Vegas. Clachair's third album, Believe in Love was released in November 1991 and was quickly followed by another TV special.

For the next three years, a hectic touring schedule saw Clachair perform to capacity audiences throughout Australia; from singing the Australian National Anthem at national and international sporting events to headlining at the Sydney Opera House and appearing regularly on Nine Network's The Midday Show with Ray Martin.

In April 1994, Clachair released her fourth studio album, Romance. The album peaked at number 62 on the ARIA charts. 

In 1995, Clachair gave birth of her second daughter and reduced her performance commitments to devote time to her family and return to her studies, completing a post-graduate degree in Counselling.

Discography

Studio albums

References

Year of birth missing (living people)
Living people
Australian singer-songwriters